Tony Henry (born 13 September 1979) is an English former professional footballer who played as a defender.

Career
Born in London, Henry began his career in the youth team of West Ham United, where he spent two years as a professional without making a senior appearance. Henry began his senior career at Lincoln City, where he made 18 appearances in the Football League between 1999 and 2001. A broken foot sustained in a reserve team match at Wrexham in April 2000 kept Henry out of the Imps first team picture at the beginning of the 2000–2001 season and on 3 November 2000 he joined Northwich Victoria on loan in order to gain some first team football. He was one of six players released by Alan Buckley at the end of the 2000–2001 season. He later played non-League football for Folkestone Invicta, Welling United, East Thurrock United, Erith & Belvedere and Dartford.

References

External links

1979 births
Living people
English footballers
West Ham United F.C. players
Lincoln City F.C. players
Northwich Victoria F.C. players
Folkestone Invicta F.C. players
Welling United F.C. players
East Thurrock United F.C. players
Erith & Belvedere F.C. players
Dartford F.C. players
English Football League players
Association football defenders